Victory Road is a professional wrestling Impact Plus event held by Impact Wrestling. Victory Road was initially the first three-hour pay-per-view card held by the promotion in November 2004. In 2006, it became an annual pay-per-view for the month of July. All events except for the 2008 edition have been held inside the Impact Zone. It was announced in January 2011 that the event would be moved from July to March, switching places with TNA's traditional March PPV, Destination X.

The PPV event was canceled in December 2012, but has since been revived as a One Night Only PPV in 2014, a television special in 2017, and as an Impact Plus Monthly Special in 2019.

History
Victory Road was a pay-per-view event consisting of a main event and undercard that feature championship matches and other various matches. The inaugural event took place on November 7, 2004 at the Impact Zone in Orlando, Florida. All Victory Road PPVS have taken place at the Impact Zone, except for Victory Road (2008), which took place at the Reliant Arena in Houston, Texas.

Victory Road (2004) was the very first 3-hour pay-per-view produced by TNA. It did not take place in 2005 as it was replaced by Unbreakable. Beginning in 2006, Victory Road became a permanent PPV on the TNA schedule.

From 2006 to 2010, Victory Road took place in the month of July. Beginning with the 2011 event, it took place in the month of March. Victory Road was switched with TNA's traditional March PPV, Destination X.

Events

References

External links
 TNAwrestling.com (Official Website of TNA Wrestling)
 TNAVictoryRoad.com (Official Website of TNA Wrestling's "Victory Road" Pay-Per-View)

Impact Wrestling Victory Road